Asher Ben-Natan (February 15, 1921 – June 17, 2014) was an Israeli diplomat and a key figure in the country's defense and diplomacy fields. Ben-Natan led the search for Nazi war criminal Adolf Eichmann, who was captured in 1960. He became the Director General of the Israeli Ministry of Defense from 1959 until 1965. Ben-Natan then served as the first Israeli Ambassador to Germany (then West Germany) from August 1965 until 1970. Ben-Natan was then appointed as Israel's Ambassador to France from 1970 until his retirement in 1974.

Asher Ben-Natan was born Arthur Piernikartz in Vienna, Austria, on February 15, 1921. His father, Natan Piernikartz, operated a clothing business in the Austrian capital. He attended a Hebrew High School and was a member of the Young Macabbi. His father bought five-acres of land in Mandatory Palestine in 1934 in response to the emergence of Nazi Germany and the growth of Antisemitism. The family drew up plans to flee to Palestine in 1938 following the Anschluss of Austria. Asher Ben-Natan fled Austria first. He boarded a Panamanian-registered ship in Piraeus, Greece, from which he sailed to Palestine. The ship dropped the passengers off at Tantura, where he swam to the beach. He found work at a kibbutz and changed his name to Asher Ben-Natan, honor of his father. His parents and sister arrived in Palestine from Austria a few months after his own arrival. Asher Ben-Natan married his wife,  Erika, 1940.

In 1978, he unsuccessfully ran for mayor of Tel Aviv.

References

External links

1921 births
2014 deaths
Ambassadors of Israel to Germany
Ambassadors of Israel to France
Jewish emigrants from Austria to Mandatory Palestine after the Anschluss
Germany–Israel relations
Burials at Kiryat Shaul Cemetery